Charles August Masse was a member of the Wisconsin State Assembly.

Biography
Masse was born on December 3, 1838, in Doesburg, Netherlands. After residing in Cook County, Illinois, and Brown County, Wisconsin, he moved to Door County, Wisconsin, in 1867.

Career
Masse was a member of the Assembly in 1879. Other positions he held include County Clerk of Door County in 1871, 1872, 1873, 1874, 1875 and 1876 and County Treasurer of Door County in 1877 and 1878. He was a Republican.

References

People from Doesburg
Dutch emigrants to the United States
Politicians from Cook County, Illinois
People from Brown County, Wisconsin
People from Door County, Wisconsin
Republican Party members of the Wisconsin State Assembly
County clerks in Wisconsin
1838 births
Year of death missing